The cylindrical lioplax, scientific name Lioplax cyclostomaformis, is a species of freshwater snail with gills and an operculum, an aquatic gastropod mollusk in the family Viviparidae.

This species is endemic to the United States.

Description 
The shell is elongate, reaching about 28 millimeters (mm) (1.1 inches (in)) in length. Shell color is light to dark olivaceous-green externally, and bluish inside of the aperture (shell opening).

The cylindrical lioplax is distinguished from other viviparid (eggs hatch internally and the young are born as juveniles) snails in the Mobile River Basin by the number of whorls, and differences in size, sculpture, microsculpture, and spire angle.

Distribution 
This species is endemic to the United States.

No other species of lioplax snails are known to occur in the Mobile River Basin (see Clench and Turner, 1955 for a more detailed description).

Collection records for the cylindrical lioplax exist from the Alabama River (Dallas County, Alabama), Black Warrior River (Jefferson County, Alabama) and tributaries (Prairie Creek, Marengo County, Alabama; Valley Creek, Jefferson County, Alabama); Coosa River (Shelby, Elmore counties, Alabama) and tributaries (Oothcalooga Creek, Bartow County, Georgia; CoahuIla Creek, Whitfield County, Georgia; Annuchee Creek, Floyd County, Georgia; Little Wills Creek, Etowah County, Alabama; Choccolocco Creek, Talladega County, Alabama; Yellowleaf Creek, Shelby County, Alabama); and the Cahaba River (Bibb, Shelby counties, Alabama) and its tributary, Little Cahaba River (Jefferson County, Alabama).

A single collection of this species has also been reported from the Tensas River, Madison Parish, Louisiana; however, there are no previous or subsequent records outside of the Alabama-Coosa system, and searches of the Tensas River in Louisiana by Service biologists (1995) and others (Vidrine, 1996) have found no evidence of the species or its typical habitat.

The cylindrical lioplax is currently known only from approximately 24 kilometers (km) (15 miles (mi)) of the Cahaba River above the Fall Line in Shelby and Bibb counties, Alabama. Survey efforts by Davis failed to locate this snail in the Coosa or Alabama rivers, and more recent survey efforts have also failed to relocate the species at historic localities in the Alabama, Black Warrior, Little Cahaba, and Coosa rivers and their tributaries.

It is listed as endangered in the United States Fish and Wildlife Service list of endangered species since October 28, 1998 (according to report 63FR57619).

Ecology 
Little is known of the biology or life history of the cylindrical lioplax.

Habitat 
Habitat for the cylindrical lioplax is unusual for the genus, as well as for other genera of viviparid snails. It lives in isolated
mud deposits found under large rocks in the rapid flowing sections of stream and river shoals. Other lioplax species are usually found along the margins of rivers in exposed muddy substrates.

Feeding habits 
It is believed to brood its young and filter-feed, as do other members of the Viviparidae.

Life cycle 
Life spans have been reported from 3 to 11 years in various species of Viviparidae.

References
This article incorporates public domain text (a public domain work of the United States Government) from the reference.

Viviparidae
Molluscs of the United States
Taxonomy articles created by Polbot
ESA endangered species